Memphis is an Austrian brand of cigarettes, currently owned and manufactured by "Austria Tabak", which is owned by the Gallaher Group, a subsidiary of Japan Tobacco.

History
Memphis was launched on March 1, 1897, by the KAISERLICH KÖNIGLICHE TABAK-REGIE. There has been confusion regarding the founding date of Memphis. From the 1980s until 2003 there are documents from Austria Tabak where they declare the introduction year of Memphis as 1897, but in 2005 they launched a new line called Memphis 1896 - and from there on they printed "Since 1896" on the Memphis packs. Austria Tabak can trace its origin to 1784, the year that the tobacco monopoly "Osterreichische Tabakregie" was formed. The name symbolized the origin of the tobacco used in Egypt. Since 1989, the brand has been a market leader in Austria. However, Altria's Marlboro became the most popular brand in Austria, beating Memphis and Austria Tabak with a market share of 35.5 percent versus 34.5 percent. In 2000, nearly one-third of all the smoked cigarettes in Austria were manufactured by Memphis. In 2010, Austria Tabak with Memphis only had a share of 14.2 percent.

In 2011, the Austria Tabak factory in Hainburg an der Donau closed when production moved to a foreign country. The reason for this is that the number of smokers declined, smuggling increased, production costs increased, and ancillary wage costs increased.

Various advertising posters were made to promote Memphis cigarettes throughout the 20th, as well as the 21st century.

Markets
Memphis is mainly sold in Austria, but also is or was sold in Germany, Switzerland, Italy, Hungary, Czech Republic, Bulgaria, Greece, Slovakia, Slovenia, Ukraine, Russia, China, Philippines, and Paraguay.

See also

 Tobacco smoking

References

Gallaher Group brands
Japan Tobacco brands
1897 establishments in Austria